Stephen David Ross (born 1935) is an American philosopher, currently Distinguished Research Professor of Philosophy, Interpretation, and Culture and of Comparative Literature at Binghamton University. He has published over 30 books in interdisciplinary philosophy, especially on art, literature, ethics, and metaphysics, from American pragmatism through poststructuralism, from human beings to animals and things.

Biography
He was born May 4, 1935, to Allan Ross and Bessie Schlosberg. He studied mathematics at Columbia University, where he received an MA in 1957, and a PhD in philosophy in 1961. He taught philosophy at the University of Wisconsin-Milwaukee and the University of Colorado in Boulder before moving to Binghamton University/State University of New York in 1967. He married Marilyn Gaddis Rose in 1968.

He spent the rest of his teaching career in Binghamton, where he helped create two interdisciplinary PhD programs, one in Philosophy, Literature, and the Theory of Criticism in the Department of Comparative Literature, the second in Philosophy, Interpretation, and Culture (PIC), located first in the Department of Philosophy, later becoming an independent program. He was appointed Distinguished Professor of Philosophy, Interpretation, and Culture and of Comparative Literature in 2006. He is currently Alfred North Whitehead Fellow in the European Graduate School, Saas-Fee, Switzerland. He was editor of the journal International Studies in Philosophy from 1979 to 2011.

Work
His career has been devoted to different possibilities of expressing and living with uncertain beliefs, unsettled experiences, and inexhaustible realities. He has explored different forms of writing and varied terminologies for expressing what resists expression, based on the conviction that such a resistance requires constant vigilance and innovative writing, the constant production and transformation of forms of knowledge, especially including philosophy, whose relations to art, literature, science, and religion enrich it profoundly with novel and imaginative questions and answers.

He began in American pragmatism, reading it to question itself fundamentally and to entail the inexhaustibility of nature and reason, the mysteriousness of things. He wrote several books on ordinality and an ordinal metaphysics, influenced by his mentor, Justus Buchler. He turned then to Alfred North Whitehead and his notion of prehension or perspective. A universe of orders composed of orders composing other orders, of perspectives, is an inexhaustible universe without totality. Everything is limited, including every limit, an inexhaustible play of limit and unlimit.

In 2002 he came to believe that such a sense of inexhaustibility required a very different style of writing, more literary and oblique, and found this in post-Heideggerian writings, especially Michel Foucault, Jacques Derrida, Emmanuel Levinas, and Deleuze and Guattari. The Ring of Representation was written in sonorous and voiced verbs—ringing, sounding—avoiding all forms of the verb "to be" so as to question the question of Being.

An ongoing theme throughout his work was that of an infinite ethics, infinite in each decision and inclusive of all things. This led him to Levinas's notions of betrayal and generosity, two notions that would deeply influence his writing. Betraying contains a double meaning, violation and revelation. He linked it with Anaximander's notion of injustice in all things, later defining it as the nonidentity of every identity with itself, a systematic and pervasive sense of how nature and reason exceed themselves, with evolution a foremost example of the first, art and literature of the second.

This was followed by seven volumes on gifts and generosity, undercutting the sense of possessing and having that color traditional views of knowledge, truth, and being. Then followed explorations of images in philosophy and art, understanding the world as images, a different way of thinking of perspectives. Images proliferate from other images, revealing and betraying them. This double movement of betraying led to books on enchantment and disenchantment, on asking and telling, to a novel, returning to an infinite and inclusive ethics through animals and other things.

These all express a sense of unceasing questioning, and questioning that questioning, that he suggests is profoundly ethical: ethical fullness.

Some publications
 2018: The Gift of Beauty: The Good as Art. Kindle edition. Amazon Publishing
 2018: Perspective in Whitehead’s Metaphysics. Kindle edition. Amazon Publishing
 2018: Invitation to Ethical Fullness: Questions Without Answers. Amazon Publishing 
 2018: A Life in Question, Amazon Publishing
 2017: Ethical Fullness: Thinking of Animals, Believing in Things, Amazon Publishing
 2013: A Philosophy Fiction, Atropos Press
 2013: Betraying Derrida, for Life, Perhaps, Atropos Press
 2012: Unsettling: Asking, Telling, Doing, Betraying, Atropos Press, European Graduate School
 2012:  Asking, for Telling, by Doing, As if Betraying, Atropos Press
 2012:  Enchanting: Beyond Disenchantment , SUNY Press
 2009: Un forgetting: Re calling Time Lost, Global Academic Publishing
 2008: The World as Aesthetic Phenomenon, Global Academic Publishing
 2005: The Gift of Self: Shattering, Emptiness, Betrayal, Global Academic Publishing
 2001: The Gift of Property: Having the Good, Betraying Genitivity, Economy and Ecology: An Ethic of the Earth, SUNY Press
 1999: The Gift of Kinds: The Good in Abundance: An Ethic of the Earth, SUNY Press
 1998: The Gift of Touch: Embodying the Good, SUNY Press
 1997: The Gift of Truth: Gathering the Good, SUNY Press
 1997: Ideals and Responsibilities: Ethical Judgment and Social Identity, Wadsworth Publishing Company
 1996: The Gift of Beauty: The Good as Art, SUNY Press
 1995: Plenishment in the Earth: An Ethic of Inclusion, SUNY Press
 1994: Locality and Practical Judgment: Charity and Sacrifice, Fordham University Press
 1994: The Limits of Language, Fordham University Press
 1993: Injustice and Restitution: The Ordinance of Time, SUNY Press
 1992: The Ring of Representation, SUNY Press
 1989: Metaphysical Aporia and Philosophical Heresy, SUNY Press
 1989: Inexhaustibility and Human Being: An Essay on Locality, Fordham University Press
 1984: Art and its Significance: an Anthology of Aesthetic Theory (editor), SUNY Press; 2nd ed in 1987, 3rd ed in 1994
 1983: Perspective in Whitehead's Metaphysics, SUNY Press
 1982: A Theory of Art: Inexhaustibility by Contrast, SUNY Press
 1981: Learning and Discovery, Gordon and Breach
 1981: Philosophical Mysteries, SUNY Press
 1980: Transition to an Ordinal Metaphysics, SUNY Press
 1972: Moral Decision, Freeman, Cooper & Co.
 1973: The Nature of Moral Responsibility, Wayne State University Press
 1971: The Scientific Process, Martinus Nijhoff Press
 1969: Literature and Philosophy: An Analysis of the Philosophical Novel, Appleton-Century-Crofts
 1966: The Meaning of Education'', Martinus Nijhoff Press

Influences
 Justus Buchler
 Jacques Derrida
 John Dewey
 Michel Foucault
 Martin Heidegger
 Luce Irigaray
 Emmanuel Levinas
 Alfred North Whitehead

See also
 American philosophy
 List of American philosophers

External links
 Philosophy Interpretation, and Culture
 Center for Interdisciplinary Studies in Philosophy Interpretation, and Culture

Living people
1935 births
20th-century American philosophers
Continental philosophy
Poststructuralists
Columbia University alumni